Portulaca oleracea (common purslane, also known as little hogweed, or pursley) is an annual (actually tropical perennial in USDA growing zones 10–11) succulent in the family Portulacaceae.

Description 

The plant may reach  in height. It has smooth, reddish, mostly prostrate stems, and the leaves, which may be alternate or opposite, are clustered at stem joints and ends. Depending upon rainfall, the flowers appear at any time during the year. The flowers open singly at the center of the leaf cluster for only a few hours on sunny mornings. The tiny seeds are formed in a pod that opens when the seeds mature. Purslane has a taproot with fibrous secondary roots and can tolerate poor soil and drought.

The fruits are many-seeded capsules. The seed set is considerable; one plant can develop up to 193,000 seeds. The seeds germinate optimally at a temperature above 25 °C; they are light germinators, with even a soil cover of 5 mm having a negative effect on germination.

Metabolism 
P. oleracea is one of the very few plants able to utilize both CAM and C4 photosynthesis pathways, for a long time believed to be incompatible with each other despite biochemical similarities. P. oleracea will switch from C4 to CAM pathways during drought, and there is transcription regulation and physiological evidence for C4-CAM hybrid photosynthesis during mild drought.

Taxonomy 

P. oleracea was recorded in 1753 by Carl Linnaeus in Species Plantarum. Due to the great variability, a large number of subspecies and varieties have been described as species of their own, but according to other publications, they all fall within the range of variation of P. oleracea. The synonyms P. oleracea subsp. sativa, P. sativa, and P. oleracea var. sativa, which are more common in the literature, refer to a somewhat more robust form in cultivation with larger seeds that cannot be separated from the species. Approximately 40 cultivars of P. oleracea are currently grown.

The flowering plant, more commonly known as winter purslane (Claytonia perfoliata), is a member of the Montiaceae family and is not closely related.

Etymology 

Distribution and habitat 
Purslane has an extensive distribution, assumed to be mostly anthropogenic (or hemerochoric), extending from North Africa and Southern Europe through the Middle East and the Indian subcontinent to Malesia and Australasia. The species status in the Americas is uncertain. In general, it is often considered an exotic weed, but there is evidence that the species was in Crawford Lake deposits (Ontario) in 1350–1539, suggesting that it reached North America in the pre-Columbian era. Scientists suggested that the plant was already eaten by Native Americans, who spread its seeds. How it reached the Americas is currently unknown.

Ecology
Compared to other common crops, P. oleracea is more tolerant of pests due to its waxy cover, which protects the plant from insects and diseases. In some instances, P. oleracea is even known to have antifungal properties. However some phytotoxic metabolites of Drechslera indica, a fungus, can cause necrosis on purslane. Dichotomophthora portulacae, another fungus, can cause stem rot.

Schizocerella pilicornis and Hypurus bertrandi are known to feed on Portulaca oleracea. In some instances, they may help control the competitiveness of P. oleracea to prevent weed infestation in fields where P. oleracea is not wanted, however, they do not stop it from growing completely.

Uses

Nutrition 

Raw purslane is 93% water, 3% carbohydrates, 2% protein, and contains negligible fat (table). In a 100-gram reference amount, purslane supplies 20 calories, and rich amounts (20% or more of the Daily Value, DV) of vitamin E (81% DV) and vitamin C (25% DV), with moderate content (11–19% DV) of several dietary minerals (table). Purslane is a rich source of alpha-linolenic acid, an essential omega-3 fatty acid.

Culinary 

All parts of purslane are edible raw, or cooked. The seeds can be eaten raw or used to make flour.

The plant may be eaten as a leaf vegetable. William Cobbett noted that it was "eaten by Frenchmen and pigs when they can get nothing else. Both use it in salad, that is to say, raw". It has a slightly sour and salty taste and is eaten throughout much of Europe, North Africa, the Middle East, Asia, and Mexico. The stems, leaves, and flower buds are all edible raw, or cooked. Purslane may be used fresh as a salad, stir-fried, or cooked as spinach is, and because of its mucilaginous quality it also is suitable for soups and stews. The sour taste is due to oxalic and malic acid, the latter of which is produced through the crassulacean acid metabolism (CAM) pathway that is seen in many xerophytes (plants living in dry conditions), and is at its highest when the plant is harvested in the early morning.

Aboriginal Australians use the seeds of purslane to make seedcakes. They add it to salads, boil it, or add it to casseroled chicken. In Turkey, besides being used in salads and baked pastries, it is cooked as a vegetable similar to spinach or is mixed with yogurt to form a tzatziki variant. In Egypt, it is also cooked like spinach as a vegetable dish, but not in salads.
In Kurdistan, people commonly make a kind of soup from it called palpina soup (شۆربای پەڵپینە). In the Alentejo region of Portugal, purslane is used for cooking a traditional soup (sopa de beldroegas) which is topped with soaked bread, poached eggs, and/or goats' cheese. In Mexico and the American Southwest, the plant is consumed as "verdolagas."

Soil salinity 
Soil salination on agricultural soils can cause a decrease in crop yields, and it is no longer possible to grow salt-sensitive species on that soil. Purslane has a high tolerance for salt toxicity, making it suitable for cropping in areas where irrigation is carried out with water with high chloride-based salinity.

Purslane can remove salt from the cultivation medium under saline conditions. As an intercrop or during one growing season, it can remove 210 kg/ha of chloride and 65 kg/ha of sodium when cultivated at 6.5 dS *m−1, allowing growth of salt-sensitive plants on saline soils. Purslane has a positive effect on companion plants in salty conditions, such as tomatoes.

Culture
Archaeobotanical finds are common at many Mediterranean prehistoric sites. In historic contexts, seeds have been retrieved from a protogeometric layer in Kastanas, as well as from the Samian Heraion dating to the 7th century BC. As Portulaca it figures in the long list of comestibles enjoyed by the Milanese given by Bonvesin de la Riva in his "Marvels of Milan" (1288).

In antiquity, its healing properties were thought so reliable that Pliny the Elder advised wearing the plant as an amulet to expel all evil (Natural History 20.210).

Verdolaga, the Spanish word for purslane, is a nickname for South American football clubs with green-white schemes in their uniforms, including Colombia's Atletico Nacional and Argentina's Ferrocarril Oeste. Afro-Colombian singer Totó la Momposina sings a song entitled “La Verdolaga.”

See also
List of beneficial weeds
List of companion plants

References

External links

 Online Field guide to Common Saltmarsh Plants of Queensland

oleracea
Bushfood
Caryophyllales of Australia
Flora of Brazil
Flora of India (region)
Flora of New South Wales
Flora of Queensland
Flora of Victoria (Australia)
Flora of the Northern Territory
Forages
Leaf vegetables
Medicinal plants
Plants described in 1753
Plants used in traditional Chinese medicine
Taxa named by Carl Linnaeus
Flora of Malta
Flora of the Coral Sea Islands Territory